Django  is an Italian-French television series created by Leonardo Fasoli and Maddalena Ravagli co-produced by Sky Atlantic and Canal+. It is an English-language reimagining of the 1966 Italian film of the same name by Sergio Corbucci. The series, consisting of ten episodes, premiered on Canal+ in France on February 13, 2023, Sky Atlantic in Italy on February 17, 2023 and Sky Atlantic in the UK on March 1, 2023.

Premise 
The series takes place in the Old West of the 1860s–1870s.  Django finds his way to New Babylon, a city founded by John Ellis, where all manner of outcasts are welcome regardless of their background or beliefs. Eight years earlier, Django's family was murdered, but he believes that his daughter Sarah survived and has been searching for her ever since. Django finds her in New Babylon, but she is about to marry Ellis. However, Sarah does not want Django to remain in town, fearing that trouble will follow him. Django is determined not to leave her again, and reconnect with his daughter.

Cast

Main 
 Matthias Schoenaerts as Django, a man searching for his daughter, Sarah, after the rest of their family was murdered.
 Nicholas Pinnock as John Ellis, the founder of New Babylon, a welcoming city to outcasts of any background.
 Lisa Vicari as Sarah, Django's long lost daughter, set to marry John Ellis.
 Noomi Rapace as Elizabeth, the merciless enemy of John Ellis.

Supporting 
 Jyuddah Jaymes, Eric Kole, and Benny O. Arthur and Elliot Edusah as John Ellis' sons.

Episodes

Production

Development 
The series was announced and commissioned by Sky Italia/Sky Studios and Canal+ in April 2015 as being developed as an Italian-French co-production by Cattleya and Atlantique Productions. It was originally to consist of 12 fifty-minute-long episodes, with the potential for future seasons. Maddalena Ravagli wrote a series treatment with Francesco Cenni and Michele Pellegrini loosely based on the 1966 film Django, directed by Sergio Corbucci, and Ravagli went on to create and write the series with Leonardo Fasoli. Francesca Comencini was set to direct the first episodes of the 10-episode series and serve as the artistic director.

Casting 
In February 2021, it was announced that Matthias Schoenaerts had been cast as Django. In May 2021, additional casting was announced including Noomi Rapace, Nicholas Pinnock, and Lisa Vicari, among several more.

Filming 
The production worked with Bucharest-based Frame Film to coordinate filming in Romania.  Initially planned to run from November 2020 to December 2021, preparations for filming actually began in February 2021.  The production closed the Racoș (Alsórákos) volcano to outside visitors without advanced notice.  This caused a disruption for visitors that had planned visits to the popular tourist destination, only to be turned away by posted signs warning that they could not enter or take photos of the area. Django is the largest television production in Romania, taking advantage of the country's cash rebate incentives and an early re-opening to international productions without quarantine requirements provided COVID-19 vaccinations are complete.

Set design was done by scenographer Paki Meduri, who constructed New Babylon in Racoș using construction methods from the era to create scenery resembling the Old West. The production began filming in May 2021, with filming expected to continue for over six months.  Additional filming took place in Bucharest and the Danube area.

Release 
The first two episodes were screened at the Rome Film Festival on October 16, 2022.

The series premiered on Canal+ in France on February 13, 2023, followed by Sky Atlantic in Italy on February 17, 2023. It later was released on SBS On Demand in Australia on February 23, 2023 and on Sky Atlantic in the UK on March 1, 2023.

References

External links 
 

2023 Italian television series debuts
2020s Italian drama television series
Italian drama television series
Canal+ original programming
Sky Atlantic (Italy) television programmes
Television shows filmed in Romania
English-language television shows
2020s Western (genre) television series
Television series set in the 1860s
Television series set in the 1870s
Spaghetti Western television series